"Soy... El Concierto" is the concert tour  by  Puerto Rican singer-songwriter Ednita Nazario in support of her studio album Soy, presented by Raisinets and AT&T. Ednita bring her concert to different countries and cities like Puerto Rico, Orlando, Panamá and Dominican Republic. In an interview at Dominican Republic, Nazario said she will conclude this tour officially on February 14, 2012 at Hotel Jaragua.

Opening acts
 Brenda Lau – (Panama)

Setlist
 "Soy Como Soy"
 "Medley: Alguien Más / A Que No Te Vas"
 "Medley: No Te Mentia / Tú Sin Mí"
 "Me Voy"
 "Sin Pausas"
 "Déjame Ser"
 "Medley: Por Ti / Devuélveme / El Dolor de Tu Presencia / Un Corazón Hecho Pedazos"
 "Cuando No Te Queden Lágrimas"
 "El Privilegio de Dar"
 "Dos Eternidades"
 "Toditas Mis Penas / Pégate"
 "La Fuerza de Un Te Quiero" 
 "Medley: Por Ti Me Casaré / Agua Profunda"
 "Intoxicándome"
 "Confesados"
 "Medley: Después de Ti / Eres Libre"
 "Sobrevivo"
 "Sin Querer"
 "Sé Que Voy A Reír"
 "Medley: A Que Pides Más / Vengada"
 "Medley: Lo Que Son Las Cosas / Más Grande Que Grande / Aprenderé"
 "Quiero Que Me Hagas El Amor"

Source:

Tour dates

Festivals and other miscellaneous performances
 These concert is part of the "Noches de Estrellas Fidelity".

Box office score data

Personnel
Producer
Angelo Medina - Puerto Rico
Tour Sponsors
Raisinets - Puerto Rico
AT&T - Puerto Rico
El Nuevo Día - Puerto Rico
KQ105 - Puerto Rico
OneLink Communications - Puerto Rico
Liberty Cable - Puerto Rico
COPEP - Puerto Rico
Vtra Produccions - Dominican Republic
Skypro - Dominican Republic

References

2010 concert tours
2011 concert tours
2012 concert tours